Southern Sudan autonomous region may refer to:

Southern Sudan autonomous region (1972–1983), during the period of autonomy at the end of the First Sudanese Civil War
Southern Sudan autonomous region (2005–2011), established at the end of the Second Sudanese Civil War